Povea is a surname. Notable people with the surname include:

Amado Povea (born 1955), Cuban footballer
Leonardo Povea (born 1994), Chilean footballer
Liadagmis Povea (born 1996), Cuban triple jumper

See also
Povel